Steven Kaplan (born October 5, 1953 in New York, United States) is a professor of African studies and comparative religion at Hebrew University in Jerusalem. He is one of the leading modern scholars on the origins of the Beta Israel, or Ethiopian Jews. He was the Dean of the Faculty of Humanities at Hebrew University from 2004-2006.

References

External links
 Steven Kaplan's Homepage.

1953 births
Living people
American expatriate academics
American ethnologists
Academic staff of the Hebrew University of Jerusalem
Educators from New York City
Israeli anthropologists
Jewish anthropologists
Ethiopianists